Mario Golf is a 1999 sports game developed by Camelot Software Planning and published by Nintendo for the Nintendo 64. Mario, his friends, and his enemies play golf on a variety of Mario-themed courses. Following NES Open Tournament Golf, it is the second game in the Mario Golf series. Camelot also developed a Game Boy Color version, which adds role-playing elements.

The Nintendo 64 version was re-released on the Wii and Wii U Virtual Console, and on the Nintendo Switch Online + Expansion Pack, in 2008, 2015, and 2022 respectively, while the GBC version was re-released on the Nintendo 3DS Virtual Console in 2012.

Gameplay

Players choose from a variety of characters including Mario, Luigi, Princess Peach, Yoshi, Wario, and a few original characters. Players can then select from a number of courses which have features adapted to the Nintendo world. As a "pick up and play" game, it simplifies the game of golf, without its complicated real-life aspects. Although the game is easy to play and simple in appearance, its engine has many variables that can affect a shot, such as wind strength and direction (indicated by a Boo), rain, characters' individual attributes, spin on the ball, and relief of the land. The variety of gameplay modes include speed golf, ring shot, mini golf, and skins match. Every character in the game has voice samples which can be used to comment on opponents' shots.

The Transfer Pak connects the Nintendo 64 and Game Boy Color versions, to exchange characters and data. A GBC character earns experience points with each round.

Reception

The Nintendo 64 version received "universal acclaim", according to review aggregator website Metacritic. Reviews of the GBC version aggregated slightly stronger than those of the Nintendo 64 version. IGN called the GBC version "an absolutely brilliant rendition of golf, and a perfect game for the go". In Japan, Famitsu gave both versions a score of 30/40.

Notes

References

External links

Mario Golf Game Boy Color site in Japan

1999 video games
Camelot Software Planning games
Game Boy Color games
Games with Transfer Pak support
Golf video games
Mario Golf
Multiplayer and single-player video games
Nintendo 64 games
Nintendo Switch Online games
Video games developed in Japan
Video games scored by Motoi Sakuraba
Virtual Console games for Wii
Virtual Console games for Wii U